The Robert Morris Colonials women represented Robert Morris University in CHA women's ice hockey during the 2014-15 NCAA Division I women's ice hockey season. The Colonials finished conference play in fourth place, and were eliminated in the first round of the CHA Tournament by RIT.  The RMU women were among the best in the nation in blocked shots

Offseason
June 27: Twenty-one players were named to the CHA All-Academic Team.

Recruiting

Standings

Roster

2014–15 Colonials

Schedule

|-
!colspan=12 style=" "| Regular Season

|-
!colspan=12 style=" "|CHA Tournament

Awards and honors

Mikaela Lowater, 2014–15 All-CHA Second Team 
Rebecca Vint, 2014–15 All-CHA Second Team
Rebecca Vint finished her NCAA career as the all-time leading Point (134) and Goals (73) leader for Robert Morris

References

Robert Morris
Robert Morris Lady Colonials ice hockey seasons
Robert
Robert